In mathematics — specifically, in complex analysis — the Berezin transform is an integral operator acting on functions defined on the open unit disk D of the complex plane C. Formally, for a function ƒ : D → C, the Berezin transform of ƒ is a new function Bƒ : D → C defined at a point z ∈ D by

It is named after Felix Alexandrovich Berezin.

References

External links
 

Complex analysis
Operator theory